Vladimir Iliev (born 17 March 1987) is a Bulgarian biathlete.

Career
He competed in the 2010 Winter Olympics for Bulgaria. His best performance was 16th, as part of the Bulgarian relay team. His best individual performance was 79th, in the individual and 83rd in the sprint.

Iliev participated and competed in the 2014 Winter Olympics. His best performance was 15th, as part of the Bulgarian relay team. His best individual performance was 38th, in the individual and 59rd in the sprint and 54th in the pursuit.

He competed at the 2018 Winter Olympics and finished 54th in the sprint, 46th in the pursuit, 19th in the individual and was part of the lapped relay.

As of February 2018, his best performance at the Biathlon World Championships, is 6th in the pursuit in 2015, his best Biathlon World Cup finish is 5th, in the sprint at Nové Město na Moravě in 2016/17, while his best overall finish in the Biathlon World Cup is 25th, in 2014/15.

On 13 March 2019, Iliev won silver in the 20km individual at the 2019 Biathlon World Championships in Östersund, Sweden – Bulgaria's best ever individual result in men's biathlon.

Biathlon results
All results are sourced from the International Biathlon Union.

Olympic Games
0 medals
:*The mixed relay was added as an event in 2014.

World Championships
1 medal (1 silver)

*During Olympic seasons competitions are only held for those events not included in the Olympic program.
**The mixed relay was added as an event in 2005.
***The single mixed relay was added as an event in 2019.

References

External links

1987 births
Biathletes at the 2010 Winter Olympics
Biathletes at the 2014 Winter Olympics
Biathletes at the 2018 Winter Olympics
Biathletes at the 2022 Winter Olympics
Bulgarian male biathletes
Living people
Olympic biathletes of Bulgaria
People from Troyan
Universiade medalists in biathlon
Biathlon World Championships medalists
Universiade bronze medalists for Bulgaria
Competitors at the 2011 Winter Universiade
21st-century Bulgarian people